The BlackBerry Key2 (stylized as BlackBerry KEY²) is a touchscreen-based Android smartphone with a portrait-oriented, fixed (not sliding) integrated hardware keyboard that is manufactured by TCL Corporation under the brand name of BlackBerry Mobile. Originally known by its unofficial codename "Athena", the Key2 was officially announced in New York on June 7, 2018. The Key2 is the successor to the BlackBerry KeyOne, and the seventh BlackBerry smartphone to run the Android operating system. It was released on July 13, 2018. An entry-level variant, the Key2 LE, was introduced in October of the same year.

Specifications

Hardware
The Key2 measures 151.4 x 71.8 x 8.5 mm, and features a 4.5" 3:2 aspect ratio multi-touch touchscreen. The top of the phone features a headphone jack, while the bottom of the phone features a USB-C port and mono speaker. The right side of the phone features the volume keys, power button, and a "convenience key" which can be programmed to launch apps, activate Google Assistant, or access other device shortcuts, and which doubles as a mute button during an active phone call.

Below the display, the Key2 features a touch-enabled 35-key backlit integrated hardware keyboard which responds to swipe gestures and doubles as a trackpad, and integrates a fingerprint scanner into the space bar. The keyboard also features a “Speed Key”, the first new key introduced on a BlackBerry keyboard in over a decade, which allows users to quickly switch between applications using programmable key shortcuts.

The Key2 is powered by an octa-core Qualcomm Snapdragon 660, and features a non-removable 3500 mAh battery which provides between 25 and 35 hours of use between charges. The phone features an 8MP front-facing camera and dual 12MP rear cameras with LED flash.

The entry-level version of the Key2, the Key2 LE, was introduced with a $399 US base price, a significant markdown from the $649 Key2. The Key2 LE features many of the same amenities of its upscale brethren, although it lacks the touch-sensitive keyboard and aluminum body (instead having a plastic construction). The Key2 LE also has the less powerful Snapdragon 636 processor and only four GB of RAM compared to the original six. As well, the Key2 LE is equipped with a smaller 3,000 mAh battery. The Key2 LE is available with either 32 or 64 GB of internal storage space.

Software
BlackBerry Key2 ships with Android Oreo 8.1.

Pre-loaded Apps 
The Key2 is preloaded with a number of BlackBerry applications, including BlackBerry Hub, which consolidates emails, calendar alerts, messages, and phone calls into a unified inbox. The phone also includes the BlackBerry DTEK security center, and BlackBerry Locker, which can be used to secure sensitive photos, files, and applications with a recognized fingerprint.

Network connectivity

Market availability 

BlackBerry has slightly changed the specs especially for APAC region and launched a dual sim variant, named BBF100-6 in India, via OnlyMobiles.

See also 
 BlackBerry KeyOne

Further reading 
 "BlackBerry Key2 User Guide" (American version). TCL Corporation.
 "BlackBerry Key2 LE User Guide" (American version). TCL Corporation.

References

External links 

Phone specifications
KEY2 Dual Sim Specifications
Official BlackBerry Key2 LE Specifications 

Android (operating system) devices
Mobile phones with an integrated hardware keyboard
Key2
Mobile phones with multiple rear cameras